Better Off is an American rock band.

Better Off may also refer to:
 "Better Off", a song by Ariana Grande from the album Sweetener, 2018
 "Better Off", a song by Cory Marks from the album Who I Am, 2020
 "Better Off", a song by Sara Evans from the album Slow Me Down, 2014
 "Better Off", a song by Theory of a Deadman from the album Gasoline, 2005
 "Better Off", a song by Ziggy Alberts from the EP Four Feet in the Forest, 2016